Mount Pleasant Regional Airport  is a city-owned, public-use airport located three nautical miles (6 km) south of the central business district of Mount Pleasant, a city in Titus County, Texas, United States. It is included in the National Plan of Integrated Airport Systems for 2011–2015, which categorized it as a general aviation facility.

Facilities and aircraft 
Mount Pleasant Regional Airport covers an area of 284 acres (115 ha) at an elevation of 364 feet (111 m) above mean sea level. It has one runway designated 17/35 with an asphalt surface measuring 6,004 by 100 feet (1,830 x 30 m). It also has one helipad designated H1 with a concrete surface measuring 44 by 44 feet (13 x 13 m).

For the 12-month period ending August 13, 2010, the airport had 13,200 general aviation aircraft operations, an average of 36 per day. At that time there were 47 aircraft based at this airport: 72.3% single-engine, 23.4% multi-engine, and 4.3% jet.

References

External links 
 Mount Pleasant Regional
 Airport page at City of Mount Pleasant website
 Mount Pleasant Regional (OSA) at Texas DOT Airport Directory
 

Airports in Texas
Transportation in Titus County, Texas